The Apple II Plus (stylized as Apple ][+ or apple ][ plus) is the second model of the Apple II series of personal computers produced by Apple Computer. It was sold from June 1979 to December 1982. Approximately 380,000 II Pluses were sold during its four years in production before being replaced by the IIe in 1983.

Features

Memory
The Apple II Plus shipped with 16 KB, 32 KB or 48 KB of main RAM, expandable to 64 KB by means of the Language Card, an expansion card that could be installed in the computer's slot 0. The Apple's 6502 microprocessor could support a maximum of 64 KB of address space, and a machine with 48 KB RAM reached this limit because of the additional 12 KB of read-only memory and 4 KB of I/O addresses. For this reason, the extra RAM in the language card was bank-switched over the machine's built-in ROM, allowing code loaded into the additional memory to be used as if it actually were ROM. Users could thus load Integer BASIC into the language card from disk and switch between the Integer and Applesoft dialects of BASIC with DOS 3.3's  and  commands just as if they had the BASIC ROM expansion card. The Language Card was also required to use LOGO, Apple Pascal, and FORTRAN 77.  Apple Pascal and FORTRAN ran under a non-DOS operating system based on UCSD P-System, which had its own disk format and included a "virtual machine" that allowed it to run on many different types of hardware.

The first-year Apple II Plus retained the original Apple II's jumper blocks to select the RAM size, but a drop in memory prices during 1980 resulted in all machines being shipped with 48K and the blocks being removed.

CP/M
Shortly after the introduction of the II Plus in 1979, Microsoft came out with the Z-80 SoftCard, an expansion card for the Apple II line that allowed the use of CP/M and contained its own Z80 CPU and logic to adapt the Z80 CPU to the Apple bus. The SoftCard was extremely popular and Microsoft's single most successful product for two years, although on the downside, it was limited to using the Apple II's GCR disk format and thus CP/M software either had to be obtained on Apple format disks or transferred via serial link from a different machine running CP/M. The SoftCard shipped with CP/M 2.2 and a special version of MBASIC that supported a subset of Applesoft BASIC's graphics commands. Other third party CP/M cards for the Apple II offered additional memory, CP/M 3.0, and CPU speeds up to 8 MHz.

Onboard Applesoft BASIC
The II Plus had the so-called "Autostart ROMs", meaning that it will attempt to boot from disk on power-up. If no system disk is present, Drive 0 will spin endlessly until the user presses Ctrl+Reset to enter Applesoft BASIC. If DOS has not been booted up, the user will only be able to load and save files to cassette from BASIC. The II Plus had a revised version of BASIC known as Applesoft II which incorporated most of the functionality from Integer BASIC, including HGR graphics commands.

Most II Pluses came with a "language card". This was completely different from the language card sold for the original II, which contained Applesoft BASIC in ROM. Since the II Plus already had Applesoft present in the ROMs on the system board, its language card contained RAM rather than ROM and if installed will boost the system to 64K. If the user types "INT", Integer BASIC is activated by swapping out the Applesoft ROM and switching in the RAM with Integer BASIC. By typing "FP", Integer BASIC is switched out and Applesoft switched back in. The machine language monitor at  may also be banked out for RAM.

Substitute lowercase functionality
Like the Apple II, the Apple II Plus has no lowercase functionality. All letters from the keyboard are upper-case, there is no caps lock key, and there are no lowercase letters in the text-mode font stored in the computer's ROM. To display lowercase letters, some applications run in the slower hi-res graphics mode and use a custom font, rather than running in the fast text mode using the font in ROM.  Other programs, primarily those where both capitalization and text movement were important, such as word processors, use inverse text mode to represent text that would be uppercase when printed. Alternatively, users can install a custom ROM chip that contained lowercase letters in the font, or purchase one of several third-party 80-column cards that enable a text mode that can display 80-column, upper- and lower-case text. The Videx Videoterm and its many clones were especially popular.

For lowercase input, since it is not possible to detect whether the keyboard's Shift keys are in use, the common "shift-key mod" connects the Shift key to one of the pins on the motherboard's paddle connector. Compatible applications, including nearly all word processors, can then detect whether the shift key was being pressed. This modification involves adding wires inside the Apple II; Apple distributed literature on how to build it, however, assuring readers that it was "the most simple and least expensive addition anyone could do". Most applications that support lower-case letters can also use the ESC key as a substitute lowercase toggle if the modification is not installed.

Repeat key
The Apple II Plus, like its predecessor the Apple II, features a repeat key on its keyboard. The key is labeled "REPT" and is located just to the left of the "RETURN" key.  The II Plus is the last Apple Computer to have this key, as later Apple computers would incorporate the ability to hold down a key for a period of time to repeat the key.

Electromagnetic shielding
The II Plus has a plastic case with a brass mesh running along the inside of the case. This mesh helped reduce the electromagnetic interference emitted from the computer, keeping the machine in compliance with newly implemented FCC regulations covering microcomputers. Small grids of plastic pins, and sometimes Velcro, were used to hold the case's top onto the computer. In comparison, the original Apple II lacked RF shielding and was often unusable with certain TVs and monitors (Apple recommended Sony TVs as they had better RF insulation than other brands).

Variants

Apple II Europlus and J-Plus
After the success of the first Apple II in the United States, Apple expanded its market to include Europe and the Far East in 1978, with the Apple II Europlus (Europe) and the Apple II J-Plus (Japan). In these models, Apple made the necessary hardware, software and firmware changes in order to comply with standards outside of the US and Canada. The power supply was modified to accept the local voltage, and in the European model the video output signal was changed from color NTSC to monochrome PAL by changing some jumpers on the motherboard and using a slightly different frequency crystal oscillator — an extra video card (which only worked in slot 7) was needed for color PAL graphics, since the simple tricks designer Steve Wozniak had used to generate a pseudo-NTSC signal with minimal hardware did not carry over to the more complex PAL system. In the Japanese version of the international Apple, the character ROM and the keyboard layout were changed to allow for Katakana writing (full Kanji support was clearly beyond the capabilities of the machine), but in most other countries the international Apple was sold with an unmodified American keyboard; thus the German model still lacked the umlauts, for example, and had a QWERTY layout instead of the standard German QWERTZ. For the most part, the Apple II Europlus and J-Plus were identical to the Apple II Plus and software compatibility was near 100%. Production of the Europlus ended in 1983.

ITT 2020

The ITT 2020 was an Apple II clone manufactured by ITT under license from Apple Computer (the first licensed clone), specifically for the European market.
In contrast to the Apple II Europlus, the ITT 2020 supported full PAL color graphics

Bell & Howell

The Apple II Plus was also sold by Bell & Howell specifically to educational markets under special license from Apple. The standard Apple II Plus was not UL-listed because the top could be opened; the B&H model was the same as the consumer version sold by Apple except that it came in a black case, which could not be opened as easily, and a special A/V package allowing it to be sold as audio/visual equipment. Bell & Howell packaged the unit with optional "back packs" that offered various inputs and outputs for A/V equipment to easily interface with the II Plus. This was the only black computer Apple would manufacture until the Macintosh TV in 1993.

Military applications
A TEMPEST-approved version of the Apple II Plus was created in 1980 by the Georgia Tech Research Institute for U.S. Army FORSCOM, and used as a component in the earliest versions of the Microfix system. Fielded in 1982, the Microfix system was the first tactical system using video disc (Laserdisc) map technology providing zoom and scroll over map imagery coupled with a point database of intelligence data such as order of battle, airfields, roadways, and bridges.

See also
Apple II series
List of Apple II games
List of publications and periodicals devoted to the Apple II
Apple II peripheral cards

References

External links
ReactiveMicro.com — Apple II Plus, Rev 7 RFI Replica Motherboard.

Plus
Computer-related introductions in 1979
Products and services discontinued in 1982